Kenneth Ernest Tovo (born March 21, 1961) United States Army Lieutenant General who most recently served as Commanding General of the United States Army Special Operations Command (USASOC). He graduated from and was commissioned from the United States Military Academy in 1983. He has also served as Deputy Commander, U.S. Southern Command, Commander, Special Operations Command Central,  Deputy Commanding General, Special Operations Command Europe,  Chief of Staff, U.S. Army Special Operations Command,  and  Commanding General, Combined Security Transition Command-Afghanistan and NATO Training Mission-Afghanistan.

Awards and decorations

References

1961 births
Living people
United States Army generals
United States Military Academy alumni